William, Prince of Wales (born 1982) is the elder son of King Charles III and the heir apparent to the British throne.

Prince William may also refer to:

Royal princes
 William Adelin (1103–1120), eldest son of Henry I of England
 Prince William, Duke of Gloucester (1689–1700)
 Prince William, Duke of Cumberland (1721–1765)
 Prince William Henry, Duke of Gloucester and Edinburgh (1743–1805)
 The Prince William, 1st Duke of Clarence and St Andrews (1765–1837), who became William IV of the United Kingdom
 Prince William Frederick, Duke of Gloucester and Edinburgh (1776–1834)
 Prince William of Hesse (1787–1867)
 Prince William of Prussia (1797–1888), who became William I, German Emperor
 Prince William (Vilhelm) of Denmark (1845–1913), who became George I of Greece
 Prince William (Wilhelm) of Prussia (1858–1941), who became Wilhelm II, German Emperor
 Prince William of Gloucester (1941–1972), grandson of George V

Sea-going vessels
  HMS Prince William, two ships of the Royal Navy
 USS Prince William (CVE-19), escort carrier of the United States Navy
 USS Prince William (CVE-31), escort carrier of the United States Navy
 PNS Rah Naward, British tall ship formerly called Prince William
 Prins Willem, a Dutch ship

Places
 Prince William County, Virginia, named for The Prince William, Duke of Cumberland
 Prince William Parkway (VA 294), a highway within the county
 Prince William Sound, Alaska, named for The Prince William, Duke of Clarence
 Prince William, Indiana, an unincorporated community named for The Prince William, Duke of Cumberland
 Prince William Parish, New Brunswick, Canada
 Prince William, New Brunswick, an unincorporated community therein

Arts and media
 Prince William (TV series), 2014 Taiwanese TV series
 Prince Wilhelm of Sweden, protagonist of the 2021 Swedish teen drama Netflix series

See also
 Prince Wilhelm (disambiguation)
 William of England (disambiguation)
 William Prince (disambiguation)